Mariana de la Noche (Lit. title: Mariana of the Night, English title: Dark Fate) is a Mexican telenovela produced by Salvador Mejía Alejandre for Televisa in 2003.

On Monday, October 20, 2003, Canal de las Estrellas started broadcasting Mariana de la Noche weekdays at 9:00pm, replacing Amor Real. The last episode was broadcast on Friday, April 23, 2004 with Mujer de Madera replacing it on Monday, April 26, 2004.

The series stars Angélica Rivera, Jorge Salinas, Alejandra Barros, César Évora, Patricia Navidad, Adriana Fonseca, René Strickler and Alma Muriel.

Plot 
In a mining village, it is rumored that Mariana Montenegro has a curse, since all the men that fall in love with her suffer a fatal accident sooner or later. Mariana is a romantic young woman who lives with her father, Atilio.

Atilio is the mine owner, a powerful man capable of cruelty when crossed. He hides a dark secret: Mariana is not his daughter and what he feels for her is far from paternal love. Atilio has two sisters: Isabel and Marcia. Isabel, the elder, is kind-hearted, she loves Mariana and has raised her as if she were her own daughter.

Marcia on the other hand is arrogant and vain, dresses in a masculine way and is hard on the miners. She is in reality a step-sister of Isabel. Cold-hearted, she has never known what love is until Ignacio Lugo-Navarro comes to town: a journalist who has come under a false name to search for his roots.

Once he gets to know Mariana, Ignacio knows that he will never be able to love another woman and his feelings are reciprocated. However, Marcia is passionately in love with Ignacio, and is full of jealousy when she discovers that Ignacio and Mariana have married in secret.

Full of fury, she reveals the marriage to her brother, and Atilio is determined to kill Ignacio without knowing that he is sentencing to death his own son, the product of the love he had with Lucrecia, the owner of the village restaurant. Destiny saves Ignacio's life when Atilio is hurt in an accident at the mine.

Mariana discovers that Atilio is not her father and she is more horrified to know that Atilio is in love with her. Desperate and thinking she is really cursed, Mariana flees from the village, pregnant with Ignacio's son. Marcia takes advantage of the situation to marry a man she does not love. She becomes pregnant but after an accidental miscarriage she seduces Ignacio and steals Mariana's son, whom she passes as her own to make Ignacio marry her.

When Mariana fled the village, she had an accident that caused her to have amnesia. Not knowing who she was, Mariana became lost in the wilderness and Maria Lola finds her. Maria Lola feeds her and protects her. She tried a few times to tell Ignacio but he didn't believe her. That is until Atilio's right-hand man, Cumache, found her.

Both Atilio and his aid took Mariana and fled to a nearby island. Atilio tried to convince Mariana that she is his wife and the child is his. Although she did not believe this, Mariana carried out her term and gave birth to her son. Atilio immediately took advantage of her weak state and had his malicious helper Cumache get rid of the newborn.

Cumache, however not being able to kill the child, decided to give him to Marcia. Mariana is discovered by her doctor friend, Camilo, and is taken away from Atilio. Hiding in the casino, Mariana remembers who she is but believes that she lost Ignacio's child. She becomes a worker to Ivan Lugo–Navarro, Ignacio's uncle, in the casino as a hostess.

Here Ignacio and Marcia discover that she is alive. Wanting to be with Mariana, Ignacio begins to search her out and fight for her love. Seeing this and the other hostess, Carol, fight for his attention, Marcia loses it and demands Mariana to stay away, using Ignacio's child as a weapon against her. Marcia even convinces Lucrecia to help her separate Mariana from Ignacio.

Mariana backs away, although deeply in love with Ignacio, and tries to make a life for herself. She convinces Ignacio that she was only  using him as a toy to get back at Marcia; since she accomplished it, he was longer appealing to her. Marcia in the end loses the love battle between Ignacio and Mariana.

She seeks out Atilio's help, knowing that he is alive and safe. Atilio, now the owner of the casino, watches over Mariana. He even comes forward and tells her that he is alive. That he wants her as his companion and to help him get back all that was his, the mine and the mansion.

Believing what she thinks is a paternal plea, Mariana agrees to his request. She begins to accompany him and help him take it all back. Marcia becoming more and more furious against Atilio and Mariana, uses the baby against Mariana to torment her of not having her child from Ignacio.

Marcia's plot however come to an end. The baby is discovered to be Mariana's. Atilio also loses out to his obsessive passion for Mariana. Once more, Ignacio and Mariana are reunited and with their son.

Cast 

 
Angélica Rivera as Marcia Montenegro de Lugo-Navarro: Atilio and Isabel's step-sister, in love with Ignacio, lover of Atilio and Gerardo
Jorge Salinas as Ignacio Montenegro "Halcon Luna": Caridad's brother, In love with Mariana, Lucrecia and Atilio's son
Alejandra Barros as Mariana Lugo-Navarro Madrigal "Mariana de la Noche": In love with Ignacio Elisa’s daughter/ Elisa Madrigal Montenegro de Lugo-Navarro
César Évora as Atilio Montenegro: Mariana's step-father, Isabel's brother, Marcia's step-brother, Caridad and Ignacio's father, Marcia and Carol's lover
Patricia Navidad as Yadira de Guerrero: Mariana and Lucrecia's friend, in love with Juan Pablo, then with Camilo
Adriana Fonseca as Caridad "Chachi" Montenegro: Mariana's step-sister and in the beginning jealous of her, Ignacio's sister, Atillio and María Lola's Daughter, in love with Camilo
René Strickler as Dr. Camilo Guerrero: In love with Mariana, then with Yadira
Alma Muriel as Isabel Montenegro: Mariana's step-aunt, Caridad and Ignacio's aunt, Atilio's sister, Marcia's step-sister
María Rojo as Lucrecia Vargas:  Ignacio's mother
José Carlos Ruiz as Isidro Valtierra: Protector of Ignacio
Patricia Reyes Spíndola as María Dolores "María Lola": Chachi's birth mother who is mentally ill
Raúl Ramírez as Father Pedro
Rafael Rojas as Ing. Gerardo Montiel: Engineer, in love with Marcia
Aurora Clavel as Mamá Lupe: Maid at the Montenegro's house
Sergio Acosta as El Cumache, foreman of Atilio
Ignacio Guadalupe as Mediomundo Páramo: Ignacio's friend, Miguelina's husband
Aleida Núñez as Miguelina de Páramo: Maid at Montenegros's house, Mediomundo's wife, in love with Ramon
Verónika con K as Ruth Samanéz
Patricia Romero as Doris
Esther Barroso as Cándida Chávez 
Arturo Muñoz as Máximo "Max" Moraje: Owner of a mini market in the village
Esperanza Rendón as Vilma Olvera: Lucrecia's friend
Gabriel Roustand as Zamora
Manuel Raviela as Benito
Valentino Lanús as Javier Mendieta: In love with Mariana
Roberto Blandón as Iván Lugo-Navarro, Mariana's uncle, hates Atilio
Marjorie de Sousa as Carol, Iván and Atilio's lover
Daniel Continente as Father Juan Pablo Guerrero: Camilo's brother, priest
Jaime Lozano as Eladio González: Worker at the Montenegro's mine
Salvador Garcini as Lauro
Benjamín Islas as Liborio Hernández, Atilio and Iván's accomplice
Liza Willert as Juanita López y Fuster
Marcelo Buquet as Ing. José Ramón Martínez #1: Engineer, in love with Chachi
Miguel de León as Ing. José Ramón Martínez #2: Engineer, in love with Chachi
Eduardo Noriega as Mr. Noriega
Agustín Arana as Oropo: Dies to the ask save to Camilo
Alexandra Graña as Jimena
Carlos Amador as Sergio López
Roberto Vander as Ángel Villaverde: Engineer, in love with Isabel
Diana Molinari as Alma Madrigal
Roberto Ruy as Miztli
Sandra Montoya as Itzel
Joustein Roustand as Gonzalito González
Ileana Montserrat as Teresita
José Luis Avendaño as Francisco
Xorge Noble as Comandante Aragón
Ricardo Vera as Comandante Romo
Sergio Jurado as Jorge Soto Moreno
Juan Ignacio Aranda as Dr. Jorge Lozano
Antonio Salaberry as Manuel Rivero
Gerardo Klein as Doctor
Jorge Pascual Rubio as Lawyer

Awards and nominations

International Broadcasters of Mariana de la Noche 

North & South America, Caribbean

Europe, Africa, Oceania

References

External links

 at esmas.com 

2003 telenovelas
Mexican telenovelas
2003 Mexican television series debuts
2004 Mexican television series endings
Television shows set in Veracruz
Televisa telenovelas
Mexican television series based on Venezuelan television series
Spanish-language telenovelas